Laguna Beach: The Real Orange County (or simply Laguna Beach) is an American reality television series that originally aired on MTV from September 28, 2004, until November 15, 2006. The series aired for three seasons and was primarily focused on the personal lives of several students attending Laguna Beach High School. Its premise was originated with Liz Gateley, while Tony DiSanto served as the executive producer.

The series was originally led by seniors Lauren Conrad, Lo Bosworth, Stephen Colletti, Morgan Olsen, Trey Phillips, Christina Schuller, and juniors Kristin Cavallari and Talan Torriero. The second season saw the additions of  Jason Wahler, Taylor Cole, Alex Murrel and Jessica Smith. Upon its conclusion, all cast members departed from the series and were replaced by a group of current students. The third season was led by Cameron Brinkman, Tessa Keller, Breanna Conrad, Lexie Contursi, Raquel Donatelli, Cami Edwards, Kelan Hurley, Chase Johnson, and Kyndra Mayo.

Conception
Created by Liz Gateley in 2004, Laguna Beach was originally planned to document a group of students' on-campus lives as they completed their secondary education at Laguna Beach High School. However, after an incident during the halftime show of Super Bowl XXXVIII briefly exposed the breast of performer Janet Jackson, the school board questioned if the network, who produced the event, held the care necessary to operate in an academic setting. Subsequently, their contract was ended, effectively jeopardizing the feasibility of the series' concept.

Throughout its run, the series was led by eight (seasons 1–2), and nine (season 3) primary cast members, who were credited by their first names. Its original main cast members were Conrad, Cavallari, Stephen Colletti, Lo Bosworth, Morgan Olsen, Trey Phillips, Christina Schuller, and Talan Torriero. The second season saw the additions of Taylor Cole, Alex Murrel, Jessica Smith, and Jason Wahler. By the conclusion of the season, all students had graduated high school, and departed the series before production of the third season began. Consequently, the program was revamped to showcase an entirely new group of current students.

Storylines

In its series premiere, Laguna Beach first introduces Lauren Conrad, Lo Bosworth, Stephen Colletti, Morgan Olsen, Trey Phillips, and Christina Schuller, who  were completing their senior year at Laguna Beach High School. Younger students Kristin Cavallari and Talan Torriero were shown to be finishing their junior year. The first season highlighted the love triangle involving rivals Conrad and Cavallari and their shared love interest, Colletti. The latter two eventually began a turbulent romantic relationship. Meanwhile, the close friendship between Bosworth and Conrad provided both with a stabilizing influence, similar to the bond between Olsen and Schuller. Phillips, an advocate for youth community involvement, coordinated a fashion show benefiting the Active Young America organization. Upon the seniors' graduation, they prepared to leave Laguna Beach and begin their college studies.

By the beginning of season two Talan Torriero developed romantic feelings for both Cavallari and Cole, though both of them were uninterested in beginning a relationship with him. Meanwhile, Jason Wahler dated Smith, Murrel, and Conrad in separate periods during production, though his player tendencies placed a strain on each failed relationship. The season concluded as the recently graduated students prepared to leave for college.

During the third season, new students are introduced such as, Cameron Brinkman who takes over Jason's role as the bad boy that can get whatever he wants. Tessa Keller, Rocky Donatelli, Kyndra Mayo, Chase, Kelan Hurley, Cami Edwards along with other additional cast members.

Reception

Criticism
The Parents Television Council (PTC) argued that the sexually explicit and profane content in the series makes the show inappropriate for its intended audience. It included the series in its 2004 study on profanity, violence, and sexual content on cable television. Although much of the profane language throughout the series is censored, the PTC pointed out that the context in which the censored words were used made them discernible, which in their view rendered the censorship useless. The PTC also criticized MTV for not including content indicators such as "L" (language) or "S" (sexual content) in addition to its television ratings for the show, a move that prevents viewers from being able to effectively use the V-chip feature found on some televisions to control the broadcast of the show into their homes. MTV airs the show several times during daytime hours in addition to its regular timeslots around 10:00 PM (ET), and the PTC claimed that the adolescents whom MTV is targeting are being exposed to "excessive sexual and profane content through inaccurately rated programs."

A 2010 study published in the journal Economics Letters demonstrated that Laguna Beach: The Real Orange County caused an increase in crime in the Laguna Beach area. While Orange County Visitor and Convention Bureau president Charles Ahlers argued that the show had boosted the local economy and made Laguna Beach a desirable travel destination, several residents of Laguna Beach were opposed to the show, claiming it was more focused on teen drama and hedonistic behavior than the art and culture of the town. During filming days, traffic jams and tourists swarming local stores for a glimpse of the cast were frequent occasions.

Scripting allegations
Laguna Beach was often criticized for appearing to fabricate much of its storyline. In one instance, Cavallari claimed that producers exploited Colletti and Conrad's friendship to exaggerate the love triangle highlighted during the first season. She also alleged that she was treated poorly by producers, which "forced [her] to be a bitch", but stated that her distaste for Conrad was not fabricated.

Episodes

Broadcast history
The first season of Laguna Beach: The Real Orange County premiered on September 28, 2004. The series continued to air on Tuesday evenings until its conclusion on December 7, 2004, at which point it had aired eleven episodes. The second season was expanded to seventeen episodes and premiered on July 11, 2005, in its new timeslot on Mondays. The finale aired on November 14, 2005. The third and final season premiered on August 16, 2006, and aired a total of fifteen episodes by its end on November 15, 2006. On July 2 2007, Laguna Beach: The Real Orange Country began airing on The N, and ran there until September 27 2009 before it became TeenNick. In July 2012, MTV aired a month-long morning marathon of Laguna Beach, titled "Retro Mania". The following year, the marathon was renamed "RetroMTV Brunch". On August 13, 2016, reruns started to air on MTV's new sister channel MTV Classic. As of December 30, 2016, the series has been removed from the schedule.
 
Laguna Beach: The Real Orange County entered an off-network syndication in 2009 and the fall of that year Trifecta Entertainment & Media put it into barter syndication and aired on affiliates of Fox, MyNetworkTV, The CW and Independent stations, however as of fall 2012 the show has left local syndication along with Punk'd and The Hills.

Newport Harbor: The Real Orange County

After the third season of the revamped Laguna Beach failed to attain the success of the original format, producers began to search elsewhere for a potential fourth installment of the series. Newport Harbor: The Real Orange County premiered on August 13, 2007, and showcased a group of students attending Newport Harbor High School. The series was led by Chrissy Schwartz, Clay Adler, Chase Cornwell, Sasha Dunlap, Grant Newman, and Allie Stockton. After the cast and storylines failed to achieve viewer interest, the program was cancelled on January 2, 2008, after broadcasting twelve episodes.

Distribution
Laguna Beach: The Real Orange County episodes aired regularly on MTV in the United States. Most episodes are approximately thirty minutes, and were broadcast in standard definition. The series' episodes are also available for download at the iTunes Store. Episodes were previously available for viewing through the official MTV website, though they have since become unavailable since the series' conclusion. The series, in addition to The Hills, were premiered in syndication in fall 2009. Since its debut, Paramount Pictures has released the first two seasons of Laguna Beach onto DVD, to regions 1, 2, and 4. Each product includes all episodes of the respective season, in addition to deleted scenes and interviews of series personnel.

See also
 The Hills
 The City
 Baldwin Hills
 Audrina Newport Harbor: The Real Orange County Freshwater Blue Harlem Heights Living on the Edge The O.C. Laguna Beach (Season 3)''

References

External links

2000s American high school television series
2000s American reality television series
2004 American television series debuts
2006 American television series endings
Culture of Laguna Beach, California
English-language television shows
Laguna Beach, California
MTV reality television series
Television series about teenagers
Television shows set in Orange County, California
The Hills (TV series)